Nicolai Andreyevich Malko (4 May 188323 June 1961) was a Russian-born American  symphonic conductor.

Biography
Malko was born in Brailov, Vinnitsky Uyezd, Podolian Governorate, Russian Empire (today part of Ukraine). His father was Ukrainian, his mother Russian. 

In 1906 he completed his studies in history and philology at the Saint Petersburg University.  In 1909 he graduated from the Saint Petersburg Conservatory, where he had included Rimsky-Korsakov, Glazunov and Lyadov among his teachers. He published articles on music criticism in the Russian press and performed as pianist and later as conductor.  In 1909 he became a conductor at the Mariinsky Theatre. Six years later he became the head conductor there.

From 1909 he studied conducting in Munich under Felix Mottl. In 1918 he became the director of the conservatory in Vitebsk and from 1921 taught at the Moscow Conservatory. From 1921 to 1924 he shuttled between Vitebsk, Moscow, Kyiv and Kharkiv, conducting in each of these cities. In 1925 he became professor of the Leningrad Conservatory.  He became conductor of the Leningrad Philharmonic Orchestra in 1926 and conducted there the world première of the Symphony No. 1 by his pupil Dmitri Shostakovich that same year, and the premiere of Shostakovich's Symphony No. 2, dedicated to him, in 1927. Malko also conducted the premiere of Nikolai Myaskovsky's 5th Symphony. Myaskovsky's 9th Symphony was dedicated to Nikolai Malko.

He was succeeded as director of the Leningrad Philharmonic by his pupil Alexander Gauk in 1928, and continued to teach at the Conservatory. In 1929, invited to appear in the West, he and his wife left the Soviet Union, and did not return for thirty years, until a U.S. State Department-sanctioned invitation from the Soviet Ministry of Culture brought him back to conduct in Moscow, Leningrad, and Kyiv. Once in the West, Malko lived in Vienna, Prague and Copenhagen, where he helped to establish the Danish Radio Symphony Orchestra, receiving the title Permanent Guest Conductor there.

While the outbreak of World War II in 1940, Malko settled in the United States, where he taught conducting. His thoughts on conducting technique were gathered together and published in a volume titled, The Conductor and his Baton (1950); A handbook on conducting currently available in the United States (Elizabeth A. H. Green: The Modern Conductor, 1996) is explicitly based on the principles set forth in Malko's book. From 1942 to 1946, he was music director of the Grand Rapids Symphony in Grand Rapids, Michigan, which was a community orchestra at the time.

Malko recorded extensively for EMI in Copenhagen and then with the Philharmonia, in London. In 1951 he premiered Vagn Holmboe's 7th Symphony with the Danish Radio Symphony Orchestra. From 1954 to 1956 he lived in Britain and was principal conductor of the Yorkshire Symphony Orchestra. Immediately after that, he moved to Australia, to take up the post of Chief Conductor of the Sydney Symphony Orchestra following the hurried departure of Sir Eugene Goossens. He remained in this position until his death in Sydney five years later.

A 4-CD box set featuring Malko conducting Tchaikovsky Symphony No.2, Shostakovich Symphony No.1, Haydn Symphony No.83, Mussorgsky Prelude to Khovanschina, Rimsky-Korsakov The Tsar's Bride & Symphonic Suite 'Antar', Bruckner Symphony No. 7 and Kodaly Szekelyfono 'The Spinning Room' is available from Lyrita (REAM.2120).

Honours
He was a National Patron of Delta Omicron, an international professional music fraternity.

In 1960, the Danish King Frederick IX named Malko a Knight of the Order of Dannebrog.

References

Sources

External links
Nikolai Malko biography
GREAT CONDUCTORS OF THE 20th CENTURY 11: NICOLAI MALKO

1883 births
1961 deaths
Ukrainian conductors (music)
Ukrainian expatriates in Australia
Academic staff of Saint Petersburg Conservatory
Soviet emigrants to the United States